The women's 10,000 metres event at the 1993 Summer Universiade was held at the UB Stadium in Buffalo, United States on 15 July 1993.

Results

1All athletes from Yugoslavia entered the games as "Independent Participants" due to United Nations sanctions against the country.

References

Athletics at the 1993 Summer Universiade
1993 in women's athletics
1993